Flying Colors is a 1917 silent American action film directed by Frank Borzage for Triangle Film Corporation, starring William Desmond as detective Brent Brewster. The film also featured Golda Madden, Jack Livingston as Captain Drake, J. Barney Sherry as Craig Lansing, and a small role for Desmond's future wife Mary McIvor as a stenographer.

Cast
 William Desmond as Brent Brewster
 Golda Madden as Ann
 Jack Livingston as Captain Drake
 J. Barney Sherry as Craig Lansing
 Mary McIvor as Stenographer
 Laura Sears as Ruth Lansing
 George W. Chase as Jimmy McMahon
 J. P. Lockney as Brewster Sr.
 Bert Offerd as The cockney
 Ray Jackson as Manager's son

References

External links
 
 
 

1917 films
American silent feature films
American black-and-white films
American action films
1910s action films
Films directed by Frank Borzage
1910s American films